Leimakhong Hill Town is a small town of Kangpokpi  District in Manipur, India .It is approximately 30Km from the State capital Imphal. The town is inhabited by Kuki, Nepali and meitei communities with Kuki as the majorities. The Divisional headquarter of The Indian Army is located at Leimakhong. According to the 2011 census, the town had a population of 3544. 

It is the headquarters of the 57th Mountain Division Of the Indian Army
Some of the villages in Leimakhong are-:
1. Leimakhong Bazar
2. Prem Nagar
3. Chingmang
4. P moulding
5. Khunkho
6. Dwarka 

There are many communities living in harmony. Kuki  and Nepali  community are in majority

References 

Cities and towns in Imphal West district